Albert MacQuarrie (January 8, 1882, San Francisco – February 17, 1950, California) was an American silent film actor.

He was signed in 1912 and starred in about 70 films before his retirement.

He starred with William Garwood in films such as Lord John in New York and The Grey Sisterhood and also starred regularly with Douglas Fairbanks.

Filmography

 Safety First (1915)
 The Prayer of a Horse or: His Life Story Told by Himself (1915)
 Things in the Bottom Drawer (1915)
 The Whirling Disk (1915)
 At the Banquet Table (1915)
 The Smuggler's Lass (1915)
 A Harmless Flirtation (1915)
 The Ulster Lass (1915)
 A Little Brother of the Rich (1915) as Muriel's Husband
 A Pure Gold Partner (1915)
 The Frame-Up (1915) as Ned Harter
 Colorado (1915) as Mr. Staples
 Lord John in New York (1915) as Doctor Ramese
 The Grey Sisterhood (1916) as Doctor Ramese
 Three Fingered Jenny (1916) as Doctor Ramese
 The Target (1916) as James Fowler
 A Serpent in the House (1916)
 The Golden Boots (1916)
 Mutiny (1916)
 From Broadway to a Throne (1916) as Emissary
 A Man's Hardest Fight (1916)
 If My Country Should Call (1916) as Col. Belden
 Manhattan Madness (1916)
 The Chalice of Sorrow (1916) as Pietro
 The Oil Smeller (1916)
 The Better Man (1916)
 The Eagle's Wings (1916) as Keron Theris
 The Melody of Death (1917)
 John Osborne's Triumph (1917)
 Perils of the Secret Service (1917)
 The Pulse of Life (1917) as 'Dago' Joe
 Mr. Dolan of New York (1917) as Count Conrad
 The Almost Good Man (1917)
 The Flopping Uplifter (1917)
 High Speed (1917) as Count Englantine
 The Clean-Up (1917) as Ed Linder
 The Midnight Man (1917) as The 'Eel'
 A Dream of Egypt (1917)
 The Master Spy (1917)
 The Lion's Lair (1917)
 A Prince for a Day (1917)
 The High Sign (1917) as Nickelob
 The Midnight Man (1917) as The 'Eel'
 Bound in Morocco (1918)
 He Comes Up Smiling (1918) as Batchelor
 A Bum Bomb (1918)
 Under False Pretenses (1918)
 Arizona (1918) as Lt. Hatton
 The Knickerbocker Buckaroo (1919) as Manual Lopez
 The Little Diplomat (1919) as Kendall
 His Majesty, the American (1919)
 When the Clouds Roll By (1919) as Hobson
 The Moon Riders (1920) as Gant, Crooked Attorney
 The Mollycoddle (1920) as Driver of the Desert Yacht
 The Mark of Zorro (1920)
 Cheated Hearts (1921) as Hassam
 The Scrapper (1922) as Simms
 One Clear Call (1922) as Jim Holbrook
 Bulldog Courage (1922) as John Morton
 The Lavender Bath Lady (1922) as Dorgan
 The Super-Sex (1922) as Cousin Roy
 The Flaming Hour (1922) as Jones
 Crimson Gold (1923) as David Ellis
 The Hunchback of Notre Dame (1923)
 What Three Men Wanted (1924)
 Don Q Son of Zorro (1925) as Col. Matsado
 The Gaucho (1927) as Victim of the Black Doom
 The Viking (1928) as Kark
 The Ship from Shanghai (1930) as Sailor

External links

 

1882 births
1950 deaths
American male film actors
American male silent film actors
Male actors from San Francisco
20th-century American male actors